UIOM is a planned ocean-going Hydrographic survey vessel of the Marina Militare to replace Italian ship Ammiraglio Magnaghi (A5303) from 2020

Characteristics 
UIOM will be a multipurpose vessel with various operational capabilities, including:
 hydrographic and oceanographic surveying;
 humanitarian intervention (evacuation) and medical support operations;
 maritime search and rescue including diving activities;
 command and control platform;
 mine countermeasures (MCM) operations management;
 helicopter and boat operations.
Driving design parameters are the efficiency in the whole speed range, extended range, remarkable seaworthiness performances. Due to the optimization of spaces, the ship is highly flexible in terms of configuration, embarked equipment and capabilities.
UIOM will be able to embark a few standard ISO1C containers, .

See also
Research vessel

References

External links
 Ships Marina Militare website

Ships built by Fincantieri
Proposed ships
Auxiliary ships of the Italian Navy
Ships built in Italy
Survey ships